Saunderton is a village in the Saunderton Valley in the Chiltern Hills, Buckinghamshire, England, in the civil parish of Bledlow-cum-Saunderton. This residential area, unlike the other two parts of the village, is in the HP14 postcode district, meaning its post town is High Wycombe, not Princes Risborough, the boundary between the two post towns passing just south of Grange Farm.

History

The toponym "Saunderton" is derived from Old English, but its original meaning is not clear. The Domesday Book of 1086 records it as Santesdune, leading some scholars to believe that the village name derives from "saint's hill".

In the 18th century a workhouse was founded in Saunderton, which in the Victorian era became the main workhouse for the Union of High Wycombe. It became one of the most secure houses in the region and regular absconders from other workhouses were often moved here because of its remote location. Inmates were taken to the workhouse by a constable, but if they wanted to leave they had a long walk ahead of them.

Saunderton Estate is in the village. The building was constructed in 1959 and redeveloped in 1994 with the addition of two wings of two-storey offices.

Parish church
The Church of England parish church of SS Mary and Nicholas was built in 1227 and originally dedicated solely to St Mary. But Saunderton had a second parish church, St Nicholas, that fell into decay. In 1452 St Nicholas' church was demolished, and St Mary's was given the double dedication to St Nicholas as well.

In 1886 the church's walls began to lean inwards, so the church was largely dismantled in 1888 and rebuilt over the next three years. Its 12th- or 13th-century font was reused and the 14th-century windows were restored and re-used. It is a Grade II* listed building.

The church has a small, timber-framed bell tower. It has three bells, all of which the bellfounder Alexander Rigby of Stamford, Lincolnshire cast in 1699. For technical reasons they are currently unringable.

SS Mary and Nicholas church is part of the parish of Bledlow with Saunderton and Horsenden, which in turn is part of the Benefice of Risborough.

References

Further reading

External links

Bledlow-cum-Saunderton Parish Council
Saunderton, St Mary & St Nicholas

Villages in Buckinghamshire